Commercial areas in a city are areas, districts, or neighborhoods primarily composed of commercial buildings, such as a strip mall, office parks, downtown, central business district, financial district, "Main Street", or shopping centers. Commercial activity within cities includes the buying and selling of goods and services in retail businesses, wholesale buying and selling, financial establishments, and a wide variety of uses that are broadly classified as "business." While commercial activities typically take up a relatively small amount of land, they are extremely important to a community's economy. They provide employment, facilitate the circulation of money, and often serve many other roles important to the community, such as public gathering and cultural events.

A commercial area is real estate intended for use by for-profit businesses, such as office complexes, shopping malls, service stations, bars and restaurants. It may be purchased outright by a developer for future projects or leased through a real estate broker. This type of property falls somewhere between residential and industrial property.
Practically every incomer must grant permission to build a new office complex or other profit-making business, the city government must determine that the chosen area is indeed commercial area. If the zones which separate commercial, industrial, and residential area are clearly zoned for commercial use, the city will allow the sale to proceed for the stated use. If any part of the property extends into a residential or industrial zone, however, then the buyer must seek a 'variance', special permission to cross over a zone boundary.

A commercial area can be held by real estate agents who treat it the same as residential areas. Signs advertising the availability and size of the real estate can be erected, and arrangements can be made to buy or lease smaller lots. Sellers may also agree to make improvements to the land, such as grading off uneven spots or clearing out unwanted trees. A professional developer may purchase huge swatches of this type of property simply to guarantee its availability for later projects.

History

The workplace grew up in tandem with the city, which by the late 19th century was often perceived as polluted, congested and riven by social and economic strife. Although the city continued its rise until the mid-20th century, the forces that would spell its decline had been gathering steam over many decades. Commuter rail, streetcars and eventually the automobile allowed a widening segment of residents to move out of city centers. While at first most people commuted back to industrial and commercial jobs downtown, eventually many employers followed suit, moving to suburban communities in search of educated workers, cheap land, fewer unions and a leafy suburban image. The now-familiar commercial landscape of office parks and corporate campuses was born.

Zoning laws
Cities often use zoning laws to prevent conflicts between residential homeowners and businesses. Land designated as a commercial area is rarely located in the middle of residential zones. City planners encourage businesses to congregate along busier streets and central downtown areas. This helps to keep traffic to these sites manageable. Some areas of the city may be designated for 'mixed usage', which means some commercial areas may be used for residential purposes. A quaint downtown shopping area with apartments would be an example of mixed usage.
Commercial areas definition may include industrial usage as well, although zoning laws still regulate the level of industry permitted. Heavier industries often purchase property on the fringes of cities or in unincorporated areas. Some commercial zones in the city do allow for light industrial usage, usually smaller factories with minimal emissions and transportation needs.

Some examples of commercial area buildings are:

 Arena
 Auditorium
 Bank
 Chain store
 Gas station
 Grocery store
 Hotel
 Movie theater
 Office
 Pharmacy
 Restaurant
 Shophouse
 Shopping mall
 Car Dealer
 Discount stores
 Warehouse clubs

Different kinds of commercial areas

The Neighbourhood Commercial 1 (CN1) zone is intended for small sites in or near dense residential neighbourhoods. The zone encourages the provision of small-scale retail and service uses for nearby residential areas. Some uses which are not retail or service in nature are also allowed so a variety of uses may locate in existing buildings. Uses are restricted in size to promote a local orientation and to limit adverse impacts on nearby residential areas. Development is intended to be pedestrian-oriented and compatible with the scale of surrounding residential areas. Parking areas are restricted, since their appearance is generally out of character with the surrounding residential development and the desired orientation of the uses.

The Neighbourhood Commercial 2 (CN2) zone is intended for small commercial sites and areas in or near less dense or developing residential neighbourhoods. The emphasis of the zone is on uses which will provide services for the nearby residential areas, and on other uses which are small-scale and have little impact. Uses are limited in intensity to promote their local orientation and to limit adverse impacts on nearby residential areas. Development is expected to be predominantly auto accommodating, except where the site is adjacent to a transit street or in a Pedestrian District. The development standards reflect that the site will generally be surrounded by more spread out residential development.

The Office Commercial 1 (CO1) zone is used on small sites in or near residential areas or between residential and commercial areas. The zone is intended to be a low intensity office zone that allows for small-scale offices in or adjacent to residential neighbourhoods. The allowed uses are intended to serve nearby neighbourhoods and/or have few detrimental impacts on the neighbourhood. Development is intended to be of a scale and character similar to nearby residential development to promote compatibility with the surrounding area. Development should be oriented to pedestrians along transit streets and in Pedestrian Districts.

Leasing commercial areas
Leasing commercial office space is one of the largest expenses incurred by new and expanding businesses, so it is important to do your due diligence. Here are some tips for negotiating a commercial lease for your small business.

Lease agreement
Lease term and rent are your first negotiation points. It is generally recommended that small businesses negotiate one- to two-year leases with the option to renew. You will also want to factor in rent increases over the term and renewal options so you are not charged with an unexpected rent increase without warning.

Consider working with a broker to help you negotiate with the landlord. It is also important to consult a knowledgeable real estate lawyer; they can often recommend the right choice for you and protect your interests as you negotiate your lease through the broker.

In commercial leases the expiration date of the lease can be extremely harsh, but through trial and error courts in the United States have created exceptions to relieve some anxieties. Commercial tenants may now use an "honest mistake" or an "inadvertence" to disregard the timely renewal of their lease. The non-renewal of the lease can also now result in forfeiture of the property to the tenant.

References

External links

Planning
Urban studies and planning terminology